National Supervisory Commission is the highest anti-corruption agency of the People's Republic of China, at the same administrative ranking as Supreme People's Court and Supreme People's Procuratorate. Its operations are merged with the Central Commission for Discipline Inspection of the Chinese Communist Party. The National Supervision Commission was formed at the first session of the 13th National People's Congress in 2018 as part of a large overhaul of the Party and government bodies that year. The Commission includes the director, deputy director, and ordinary members and the director is appointed by the National People's Congress.

Background 

The National Supervisory Commission was formed as part of a series of reforms to China's anti-corruption system during the first term of Xi Jinping as General Secretary of the Communist Party. The NSC roots originated from the imperial Chinese supervision system which originated in the Qin and Han dynasties. The system has been functioning for more than two thousand years. The names and structures of the supervisory offices may vary from one dynasty to another. However, they share the same values. For centuries, these offices aimed to uphold justice, enforce discipline and supervise government ethics. To achieve the goals, government officials periodically investigated, conducted visits and reported cases of impeachment to emperors.

After the 1911 Revolution, the founder of the Republic of China, Sun Yat-sen advocated a five-power constitution to spearhead the Chinese revolution. Drawing from the Western separation of powers (three branches: a legislature, an executive, and a judiciary), he added another two traditional Chinese government powers, examination and supervision (control), to propose the Five-Power Constitution. The Constitution of the Republic of China was promulgated in 1947 which made the Control Yuan a parliamentary chamber until the reforms of 1991 which it became the sole auditory body in Taiwan.

While the Communist Party had institutionalized internal mechanisms for combating corruption in some form since its founding and the establishment of the People's Republic of China in 1949, it was apparent that it was largely ineffective at curbing systemic corruption, and otherwise had no legal basis, as the main organ tasked with combating corruption and malfeasance, the Central Commission for Discipline Inspection, was a party organ, not a state one.

Prior to Xi's anti-corruption campaign, offenses were often prosecuted at the direction of local party authorities through their control of local Commissions for Discipline Inspection (CDIs) and procuratorial organs. While these authorities theoretically reported to their superior commissions at the next higher level of administration (i.e. the municipal organ would report to the provincial one, the provincial organ would report into the CCDI), in addition to answering to the local party leadership, in reality the local CDIs only answered to local party leaders, as they controlled the budgets, personnel, and resources of these organizations. This often led to arbitrary exercise of power and political selectiveness in the targets of corruption efforts.

Formation
In late 2016, Supervisory Commissions (SCs) began pilot initiatives in Shanxi, Beijing and Zhejiang. Provincial level chiefs of Discipline Inspection began serving concurrently as heads of the local Supervisory Commissions.

The formation of the National Supervisory Commission centralized control of anti-corruption resources to the central authorities and was aimed at curbing local interference in anti-corruption efforts. The former National Anti-Corruption Bureau, the Office Against Dereliction of Duty, and the anti-corruption department of the Procuratorate were all folded into a single agency.

In February 2018, an amendment to the constitution was proposed to make national and local supervision commissions official state organs. Local commissions will be appointed by local peoples' congresses at county and higher level and will be accountable to them and to the supervision commission at the higher level.

List of directors

See also 
 Anti-corruption campaign under Xi Jinping
 Central Leading Group for Inspection Work
 Commission Against Corruption (Macau)
 Corruption in China
 Independent Commission Against Corruption (Hong Kong)
 Ministry of Supervision

References 

2018 establishments in China
Anti-corruption agencies
Corruption in China
Government agencies of China